The Kansas Association of Broadcasters is a group supporting broadcasters in Kansas, United States, primarily through lobbying and coordination.

History
The Kansas Association of Broadcasters began in 1951 as the Kansas Association of Radio Broadcasters, when a central Kansas broadcaster sat down to read a letter from Grover C. Cobb, who was vice-president/general manager of KVGB (AM)/FM, in Great Bend.

Board of directors
The 2013 Board of Directors are:

 Officers
 Monte Miller, Chair (Rocking M Radio, Inc.)
 Jim Ogle, Chair-Elect (WIBW-TV)
 Bruce Dierking, Secretary-Treasurer (KNDY (AM)/FM)
 Gordon Johnson, Past Chairman (KLEY (AM)|KLEY]]/KWME/KKLE)

 Directors
 Rob Burton (Clear Channel Radio)
 Larry Calvery (KRSL (AM)/FM)
 Janet Campbell (Kansas Public Radio)
 John Dawson (KNSW)
 George DeMarco (KKOW (AM)/FM, KJML
 Ron Thomas (KVOE (AM)/KVOE-FM, KFFX-FM
 Mark Trotman (KWBW/KHUT/KHMY
 Kent Cornish, President/Executive Director

References

External links
 

Organizations based in Kansas